The Piccadilly Theatre is a West End theatre located at 16 Denman Street, behind Piccadilly Circus and adjacent to the Regent Palace Hotel, in the City of Westminster, London, England.

Early years 
Built by Bertie Crewe and Edward A. Stone for Edward Laurillard, its simple façade conceals a grandiose Art Deco interior designed by Marc-Henri Levy and Gaston Laverdet, with a 1,232-seat auditorium decorated in shades of pink. Gold and green are the dominant colours in the bars and foyer, which include the original light fittings. Upon its opening on 27 April 1928, the theatre's souvenir brochure claimed, "If all the bricks used in the building were laid in a straight line, they would stretch from London to Paris." The opening production, Jerome Kern's musical Blue Eyes, starred Evelyn Laye, one of the most acclaimed actresses of the period.

The Piccadilly was briefly taken over by Warner Brothers, and operated as a cinema using the Vitaphone system, and premièred the first talking picture to be shown in Great Britain, The Singing Fool with Al Jolson. The theatre reopened in November 1929, with a production of The Student Prince, having a success in January 1931 with Folly to be Wise, running for 257 performances.

The building sustained damage when it was hit by a stray German bomb during World War II.

Since 1960 
In 1960, the Piccadilly was acquired by Donald Albery and became part of his group of London theatres. In the 1960s and 1970s, the Piccadilly improved its reputation with a series of successful transfers from Broadway: Who's Afraid of Virginia Woolf?, A Streetcar Named Desire and Man of La Mancha made their London debuts at the theatre. The Beatles recorded a number of songs at the Piccadilly on 28 February 1964 for the BBC Radio show, "From Us to You". In 1976, the Jerome Kern and Guy Bolton musical Very Good Eddie ran for 411 performances at the theatre. The cast included Prue Clarke.

In 1986, the venue was the setting for ITV's Sunday evening variety show, Live From the Piccadilly, hosted by Jimmy Tarbuck. The 1990s witnessed an expansion in ballet and dance, notably the most successful commercial ballet season ever to play in the West End, including Matthew Bourne's acclaimed production of Swan Lake.

The Piccadilly has played host to many famous stars such as Henry Fonda, Ian McKellen, Judi Dench, Michael Pennington, Barbara Dickson, Lynn Redgrave, Julia McKenzie, Eric Sykes, and Dame Edna. Its productions have run the gamut from Edward II to Spend Spend Spend to Noises Off to Blues in the Night to a season of plays directed by Sir Peter Hall.

The Donmar Warehouse production of Guys and Dolls ran at the Piccadilly from 19 May 2005 to 14 April 2007. It was followed by Paul Nicholas and David Ian's production of Grease which opened on 8 August 2007 and was the longest running show in the theatre's history before closing in April 2011 to make way for Ghost the Musical, which transferred to the Piccadilly in June 2011 following its world premiere at the Manchester Opera House.

On 6 November 2019 during an evening performance of Death of a Salesman, a section of plasterboard of the ceiling above the rear upper circle of theatre collapsed onto the audience with four people being taken to hospital. The incident was caused by a localised water leak. The local authority deemed the theatre safe to re-open two days later.

Recent and present productions 
 Ragtime (19 March 2003 – 14 June 2003) starring Maria Friedman
 Noises Off (13 August 2003 – 8 November 2003) by Michael Frayn
 Jumpers (20 November 2003 – 6 March 2004) by Tom Stoppard
 Jailhouse Rock – The Musical (19 April 2004 – 23 April 2005) by Rob Bettinson and Alan Janes
 Guys and Dolls (19 May 2005 – 14 April 2007) by Frank Loesser, Jo Swerling, and Abe Burrows, starring at various times – Ewan McGregor, Jane Krakowski, Jenna Russell, Douglas Hodge, Nigel Harman, Sarah Lancashire, Patrick Swayze, Don Johnson, Ben Richards, Adam Cooper, Sally Ann Triplett, Amy Nuttall, Samantha Janus, Neil Morrissey, Alex Ferns, and Claire Sweeney
 Grease (24 July 2007 – 30 April 2011) by Jim Jacobs and Warren Casey, starring Danny Bayne, Susan McFadden, Siobhan Dillon, Noel Sullivan and Ray Quinn
 Ghost the Musical (19 July 2011 – 6 October 2012) by Bruce Joel Rubin, Dave Stewart, and Glen Ballard. Starring at various times – Richard Fleeshman, Caissie Levy, Andrew Langtree, Siobhan Dillon, Sharon D. Clarke, Da'Vine Joy Randolph
 Viva Forever (27 November 2012 – 29 June 2013) by Jennifer Saunders, produced by Judy Craymer
 Dirty Dancing (13 July 2013 – 22 February 2014) based on the film of the same name.
 Jersey Boys (15 March 2014 – 26 March 2017) based on the story of Frankie Valli and the Four Seasons.
 Annie (23 May 2017 – 18 February 2018), starring at various times Miranda Hart, Craig Revel Horwood and Meera Syal.
 Strictly Ballroom (from 24 April 2018), starring Will Young.
 The Curious Incident of the Dog in the Night-Time (29 November 2018 – 27 April 2019), revival of National Theatre production.
 The Lehman Trilogy (11 May 2019 – 31 August 2019), transfer from National Theatre, directed by Sam Mendes, starring Simon Russell Beale, Adam Godley and Ben Miles
 Death of a Salesman (5 November 2019 – 4 January 2020) starring Wendell Pierce and Sharon D Clarke
 Pretty Woman (1 March 2020 – 16 March 2020) starring Danny Mac and Aimie Atkinson (production closed early due to COVID-19 pandemic; reopened at the Savoy Theatre in July 2021)
 Moulin Rouge! (20 January 2022 - )

References

Further reading

External links 
 

West End theatres
Theatres completed in 1928
Theatres in the City of Westminster
1928 establishments in England